John Ogilvie (born 14 July 1958) is a South African former cricketer. He played in 39 first-class and 15 List A matches from 1976/77 to 1989/90.

References

External links
 

1958 births
Living people
South African cricketers
Border cricketers
Eastern Province cricketers
Griqualand West cricketers
People from Stutterheim
Cricketers from the Eastern Cape